The 2012–13 Biathlon World Cup – World Cup 9 was held in Khanty-Mansiysk, Russia, from 14 March until 17 March 2013.

Schedule of events

Medal winners

Men

Women

Achievements

 Best performance for all time

 , 2nd place in Sprint
 , 10th place in Sprint

 , 2nd place in Pursuit
 , 17th place in Sprint
 , 30th place in Sprint
 , 62nd place in Sprint

References 

World Cup 9
Biathlon World Cup - World Cup 9
March 2013 sports events in Europe
Sport in Khanty-Mansiysk
Biathlon competitions in Russia